Criterion Games is a British video game developer based in Guildford. Founded in January 1996 as a division of Criterion Software, it was owned by Canon Inc. until Criterion Software was sold to Electronic Arts in October 2004. Many of Criterion Games' titles were built on the RenderWare engine, which Criterion Software developed. Notable games developed by Criterion Games include racing video games in the Burnout and Need for Speed series. As of April 2017, Criterion Games employ approximately 90 people.

History

Background and foundation (1993–1996) 
David Lau-Kee, the founder and leader of Canon Inc.'s European research arm, established Criterion Software as a wholly owned subsidiary of Canon in December 1993 and assumed the managing director role for it. At the time, Canon was seeking to establish a multimedia tool development business, while Lau-Kee had been working on interactive 2D image processing techniques and was looking to extend this to 3D image processing and, in turn, "out-and-out" 3D graphics. Adam Billyard, who served as its chief technology officer, is also credited as a co-founder. Criterion Software's 3D texture mapping and rendering programme, RenderWare, was first released in 1993 as a software library for the C programming language and was adopted by 800 companies worldwide by October 1996. The firm also provided a demo game, CyberStreet, while fully-fledged games were developed by companies like 47Tek. Meanwhile, competitor Argonaut Software developed full games—including FX Fighter and Alien Odyssey–to showcase its BRender technology. In response, Criterion Software hired new staff in a 1995 to establish a dedicated game development division. To support this expansion, Criterion Software moved to new offices within Guildford in late 1995. The division, Criterion Studios, was established in January 1996 and announced the month thereafter, at the time employing 25 people. The headcount expanded to around 35 by October.

RenderWare was thereafter gradually retooled as a game development programme, with its third iteration, released in 2000, first providing full game engine capabilities. The first game to use this version was Burnout, which Criterion Studios developed in-tandem. Publishing rights to the game were sold to Acclaim Entertainment, while Criterion Studios retained the intellectual property to the brand and technology. Acclaim published Burnout (2000) and its sequel, Burnout 2: Point of Impact (2002), which accumulated around 2 million sales. Despite this, Acclaim lacked the resources to market them in the United States, its home territory, leading to poor sales in the country. At the same time, Criterion Studios (now named Criterion Games) was frequently approached by Electronic Arts (EA), which eventually signed with Criterion Games for the third release in the series, Burnout 3: Takedown (2004).

Under Electronic Arts (2004–present) 
In July 2004, EA announced that it had reached an agreement with Canon's European arm, Canon Europe, to acquire all of the Criterion Software group, including Criterion Games. The deal was finalised on 19 October 2004, with EA paying . After the purchase, both Criterion and Electronic Arts declared that RenderWare would continue to be made available to third-party customers. However, some clients decided it was too risky to rely on technology owned by a competitor. Electronic Arts have since withdrawn RenderWare from the commercial middleware market, although remnants are still used by internal developers. In mid-2006, the company closed its Derby satellite office, making all of its programmers and support staff redundant. In early March 2007, Electronic Arts combined its Chertsey-based UK development studio and Criterion Games into a new building in central Guildford. Integration of the teams did not occur and the location housed two very separate development studios: Criterion Games and EA Bright Light before Bright Light was shut permanently in 2011. In November 2007, co-founder and CEO David Lau-Kee made the decision to leave Electronic Arts to concentrate on advisory activities within the games industry. Adam Billyard also left Electronic Arts as CTO of EATech in 2007 to pursue other projects.

On 14 June 2010, Criterion announced that Need for Speed: Hot Pursuit was set for release in November 2010. The software utilises a new game engine named Chameleon. On 1 June 2012, Electronic Arts announced Criterion's second Need for Speed title, Need for Speed: Most Wanted, which was released on 30 October 2012. At Electronic Entertainment Expo 2012, Criterion Games announced that it had taken sole ownership of the Need for Speed franchise.

On 28 April 2013, Alex Ward announced via Twitter that the studio is planning to steer away from its tradition in developing racing games and are instead focusing on other genres for future projects. On 13 September 2013, Criterion elected to cut its staff numbers to 17 people total, as 80% (70 people) of the studio moved over to Ghost Games UK to work with Need for Speed games.

On 3 January 2014, it was announced that Alex Ward and Fiona Sperry left Criterion to found a new studio, Three Fields Entertainment. Their first game Dangerous Golf, slated for release in May 2016, combined ideas from Burnout and Black and is to lead them throws a spiritual successor to Burnout. At the Electronic Entertainment Expo 2014, the company announced a new racing project. However, the project was cancelled as Criterion is now focusing on providing additional support to other EA studios in creating future Star Wars games. Criterion worked on Star Wars Battlefront: X-Wing VR Mission, a new virtual reality mission for Star Wars Battlefront; the company would return to do additional work for the 2017 sequel.

In June 2015, news site Nintendo Life reveals that in early 2011 Nintendo of Europe approached Criterion to work on a pitch for a new F-Zero game which they hoped to unveil at E3 that same year alongside the then-unreleased Wii U console, and potentially release the game during the console's launch period. However, the developer was unable to handle the pitch as, at the time, they devoted much of their resources into the development of Need for Speed: Most Wanted for multiple platforms. The site was tipped by an anonymous, yet "reliable" source, but they had confirmed this information when Criterion co-founder Alex Ward (who left the company in 2014) admitted that Nintendo of Europe did indeed approach the company for a potential F-Zero game on the Wii U. Alex Ward also noted on Twitter that Criterion was also offered the opportunity to work on the first Forza, Mad Max, a Vauxhall only racer, a Command & Conquer first-person shooter and a Gone in 60 Seconds game.

In 2018, EA announced that Battlefield V would have a battle royale mode and would be developed by Criterion. Following the release of the mode (later revealed to be called Firestorm), development was halted soon after with the mode considered a failure by fans. In 2020, Criterion was announced to return as the main developer of the Need for Speed series, but work on the title was put on hold as Criterion was assigned to do additional work, including vehicular gameplay, on the next Battlefield game in March 2021. The aforementioned game, Battlefield 2042, was released on November 19, 2021.

In May 2022, EA merged Codemasters subsidiary Codemasters Cheshire into Criterion Games to support effort on the Need for Speed series as the two companies were already working together on a new title in the series together for months. On 6 October 2022, the project was revealed to be Need for Speed Unbound, which utilizes DICE's propietary Frostbite engine. Unbound was released on December 2, 2022, following which five senior members of Criterion announced their departures from the studio, including the current studio GM, Matt Webster. They created Fuse Games in 2023

Games developed

Accolades 
GamesIndustry.biz named Criterion Games among the "best places to work in the UK video games industry" in the "Best Mid-sized Companies" category in 2017, 2018, and 2019.

References

External links 
 

1996 establishments in England
2004 mergers and acquisitions
British companies established in 1996
British subsidiaries of foreign companies
Companies based in Guildford
Electronic Arts
Video game companies established in 1996
Video game companies of the United Kingdom
Video game development companies